Pachyphytum is a small genus of succulents in the family Crassulaceae, native to Mexico, at elevations from . The name comes from the ancient Greek pachys (=thick) and phyton (=plant) because of the shape of the leaves.

Description 
The species of the genus Pachyphytum are perennial succulent plants. They grow as hairless rosette plants. The usually short shoots are upright up to 70 cm young and later prostrate to longer than 1 m. The usually simple and occasionally basally branching shoots can reach a diameter of up to 3.5 cm. The rosettes have a diameter of 6 to 20 cm and are made up of 10 to 40, rarely up to 80, clearly separated leaves that are often intensely blue frosted. Towards the shoot tip, the leaves are much more crowded together. The young leaves are more or less erect, later spreading and the older ones often curled back. They are obovate to spatulate or elliptical-oblong to lanceolate and usually end blunt to pointed.

The upright inflorescence emerges laterally from the leaf axils of the upper leaves. The lower 10 to 20 cm of the flower stalks are leafless, the upper 6 to 9 cm are covered with basally spurred, leaf-like bracts. The inflorescence is simple and initially overhanging. Later it is erect and bears up to 50 individual flowers. The bracts (bracts) are mostly overlapping and elliptical to obovate or lanceolate in shape. They are basally often arrow-shaped to stalk-encompassing or more or less bidentate spurred.

The flower stalk, which becomes thicker towards the top, has a diameter of 2 to 15 mm. The flowers are five, rarely sixfold and obdiplostemon. The tubular, barrel or bell-shaped, sometimes pentagonal corolla measures 5.5 to 17 mm × 3.5 to 10 mm at the base and 4.5 to 17 mm in diameter at the top. It is white to pink, more rarely orange to red or reddish in color. The elongated to oblanceolate petals are 7–17 mm × 2.5–6 mm in size. The flower tube is usually spread out above the middle and bent back at the time of flowering. On the inside there is usually a red spot above the middle. The stamens are in two circles. The greenish or red styles are indistinctly set off and 1 to 2 mm in size. Pollination is probably by hummingbirds.

The fruits are splaying and open partially to fully at the suture. The obovate seed is smooth, reddish brown and 0.5–0.8 mm × 0.25–0.4 mm in size.

Species
The genus Pachyphytum was established by Heinrich Friedrich Link, Johann Friedrich Klotzsch and Christoph Friedrich Otto in 1841 and first described in the Allgemeine Gartenzeitung. The natural range of plants of the genus is eastern and central Mexico. They grow there on rocky slopes at altitudes of 600 to 2500 m.

According to Joachim Thiede, the genus Pachyphytum includes the following species, which are divided into two sections

References

External links
 
 

Crassulaceae
Crassulaceae genera